William Alexander McLaren  (8 May 189830 September 1973) was a senior Australian public servant. He was Secretary of the Department of the Interior between 1949 and 1963.

Life and career
Bill McLaren was born in Sydney on 8 May 1898. Hisparents were William McLaren and Esther May Manning.

He graduated from Sydney University.

McLaren moved to Canberra in 1945 into the Australian Public Service as the Commonwealth Director of War Service Land Settlement.

Between 1949 and 1963, McLaren was Secretary of the Department of the Interior.

McLaren died on 30 September 1970.

Awards
McLaren was made a Commander of the Order of the British Empire in 1954.

References

1898 births
1973 deaths
Australian public servants
Australian Commanders of the Order of the British Empire